Chkhartishvili is a Georgian surname which may refer to:

 Luka Chkhartishvili, one of the Georgian horsemen in Wild West shows
 Grigory Chkhartishvili, known as Boris Akunin, Russian writer of Georgian origin
 Ivane Chkhartishvili, Georgian businessman
 Otar Chkhartishvili, Georgian naval officer

Georgian-language surnames